Duži is a village in the municipality of Trebinje, Republika Srpska, Bosnia and Herzegovina.

See also
Duži Monastery

References

Villages in Republika Srpska
Populated places in Trebinje